Tough All Over is the second album by American country music songwriter Shelby Lynne. It was released in 1990 via Epic Records. It includes the singles "I'll Lie Myself to Sleep" and "Things Are Tough All Over".

Content
The album includes several cover songs: "Lonely Weekends" was originally released by Charlie Rich, "I Walk the Line" by Johnny Cash, and "Don't Get Around Much Anymore" by Duke Ellington.

Critical reception
Thom Jurek of Allmusic rated the album 4 out of 5 stars, saying that "It just isn't a strictly country outing, but it's a truly fine pop-country record."

Track listing
"I'll Lie Myself to Sleep" (Tony Haselden, Tim Mensy) - 4:06
"Don't Mind If I Do" (Skip Ewing) - 2:41
"Lonely Weekends" (Charlie Rich) - 2:24
"Things Are Tough All Over" (Trey Bruce, Lisa Silver) - 3:58
"Dog Day Afternoon" (Wayne Carson) - 3:42
"Baby's Gone Blues" (Pat Bunch, Pam Rose, Mary Ann Kennedy) - 3:19
"Till a Better Memory Comes Along" (Mensy, Gene Dobbins, Glenn Ray) - 2:42
"I Walk the Line" (Johnny Cash) - 2:38
"What About the Love We Made" (John Rotch) - 3:42
"Don't Get Around Much Anymore" (Duke Ellington, Bob Russell) - 2:50

Charts

Weekly charts

Year-end charts

Singles

References

1990 albums
Epic Records albums
Shelby Lynne albums
Albums produced by Bob Montgomery (songwriter)